Jérémy Malherbe (born 15 March 1991) is a French former professional footballer who played as a goalkeeper.

Malherbe signed a short-term contract with Scottish Premiership club Dundee in January 2018, and was released at the end of the season.

Popularity in Serbia 
Although Malherbe has never played football in Serbia, he has surprisingly accumulated a fairly noticeable number of fans in that country, and is a subject of a somewhat of a cult following. This curiosity is attributed to the users of the Serbian humour website Vukajlija, who jokingly claimed that Malherbe, then a member of Grenoble Foot 38, sent them betting tips. Although the claims were quickly discovered to be false, the users soon formed an online fan club, posting updates about Malherbe's football career and achievements.

Career statistics

References

External links 
 
 

1991 births
Living people
French footballers
Footballers from Strasbourg
Association football goalkeepers
French expatriate footballers
Expatriate footballers in Belgium
Expatriate footballers in Belarus
Expatriate footballers in Scotland
Expatriate footballers in Greece
French expatriate sportspeople in Belgium
Ligue 2 players
Belarusian Premier League players
Super League Greece players
Grenoble Foot 38 players
Gap HAFC players
Stade de Reims players
K.S.V. Roeselare players
FC Dynamo Brest players
Dundee F.C. players
Panionios F.C. players